Baseball at the 1995 Pan American Games was contested between teams representing Argentina, Brazil, Cuba, Guatemala, Mexico, Netherlands Antilles, Nicaragua, Panama, Puerto Rico, and the United States. The 1995 edition was the 12th Pan American Games, and was hosted by Mar del Plata.

Cuba entered the competition as the six-time defending champions, having won each gold medal dating back to 1971. They successfully defended their title, with Nicaragua finishing second.

Medal summary

Medal table

Medalists

References

 

Events at the 1995 Pan American Games
1995
Pan American Games
1995 Pan American Games